Koradacheri is a panchayat town in Thiruvarur district in the Indian state of Tamil Nadu. It lies between the rivers Vettar and Vennar flowing at a distance of about 1.5 km. 

This is the Panchayat Town. Major income only from Agriculture, most of them are farmers. There are two government schools (Boys & Girls). There is a Railway station and a Government hospital.

Demographics
 India census, Koradacheri had a population of 5970. Males constitute 50% of the population and females 50%. Koradacheri has an average literacy rate of 75%, higher than the national average of 59.5%: male literacy is 81%, and female literacy is 69%. In Koradacheri, 11% of the population is under 6 years of age.

Climate

References

Cities and towns in Tiruvarur district